Stina Troest (born January 17, 1994) is a Danish hurdler. She ran the 400 meter hurdles at the Youth Olympic Games in Singapore 2010 and won silver.

Competition record

References

1994 births
Danish female hurdlers
Danish female middle-distance runners
Living people
Athletes (track and field) at the 2010 Summer Youth Olympics
World Athletics Championships athletes for Denmark
Athletes (track and field) at the 2016 Summer Olympics
Olympic athletes of Denmark
Athletes from Copenhagen